Dortmund-Dorstfeld Süd station is an underground station in the district of Dorstfeld of the city of Dortmund in the German state of North Rhine-Westphalia. It was built on a loop line (line 2190) off the Witten/Dortmund–Oberhausen/Duisburg railway, which was opened on 24 September 1983 from Bochum-Langendreer to Dortmund-Dorstfeld. The station was also opened on 24 September 1983 and it is classified by Deutsche Bahn as a category 4 station.

The station is served by line S 1 of the Rhine-Ruhr S-Bahn (Dortmund–Solingen) every 15 minutes during the day between Dortmund and Essen.

References

Rhine-Ruhr S-Bahn stations
S1 (Rhine-Ruhr S-Bahn)
Railway stations in Dortmund
Railway stations in Germany opened in 1983
1983 establishments in West Germany